Cyperus retroflexus is a perennial species of sedge, commonly known as oneflower flatsedge.

It was known under the synonym C. uniflorus until the 1990s.

See also
 List of Cyperus species

References

retroflexus
Flora of North America